The Croatian-North American Soccer Tournament is a soccer tournament established in 1964 featuring teams representing the Croatian Canadian and Croatian American communities. It is organized by the Croatian National Soccer Federation of Canada & the U.S., and hosted annually by a CNSF member club.

It is traditionally played on the Labour Day weekend to accommodate teams who have to travel long distances. There is no prize money for winning the tournament. The event attracts large Croatian crowds and is intended to allow each host club to gain financially so that they can maintain stability and promote their Croatian name and heritage in their own cities.

The dynasties of the competition are Toronto Croatia and Chicago CBP. Similar tournaments for Croatian diaspora teams are held in the west coast of North America and in Australia.

Tournament Winners

Chicago CBP, 16 titles
Toronto Croatia, 13 titles
Hrvat Chicago, 7 titles
Cleveland Croatia, 5 titles
Hamilton Croatia, 2 titles
Chicago Zrinski, 2 title
Kitchener Hrvat, 1 title
London Croatia, 1 title
Oakville Velebit, 1 title
Windsor Croatia, 1 title
Vancouver Croatia, 1 title
Cleveland Zagreb, 1 title
New York Croatia, 1 title
Streetsville Dalmacija, 1 title

History of Tournaments

External links 
Croatian National Soccer Federation of Canada and USA

Croatian diaspora organizations
Soccer cup competitions in Canada
Soccer cup competitions in the United States
Croatian-American history
Canada–Croatia relations
Recurring sporting events established in 1964